FK Dolno Konjari is a football club of the Bosniak community based in the village of Dolno Konjari near Skopje, North Macedonia. They currently play in the OFS Gazi Baba league.

History
The club was founded in 2013.

References

External links

Club info at MacedonianFootball 
Football Federation of Macedonia 

Football clubs in North Macedonia
Association football clubs established in 2013
2013 establishments in the Republic of Macedonia
FK